Enrique Octavio de la Madrid Cordero (Mexico City, born 1 October 1962) is a lawyer, a public official, a columnist and Mexican politician. He is a member of the Institutional Revolutionary Party.

Biography 
He is the son of Paloma Cordero, former First Lady of Mexico, and Miguel de la Madrid, former Mexican President (1982-1988). He was a federal congressman as a member of the PRI.

Enrique de la Madrid has a law degree from the National Autonomous University of México (UNAM) and has a Master's in Public Administration from the John F. Kennedy School of Government at Harvard University. He was a professor at ITAM (Autonomous Technical Institute of México) from 1996-1998.

Public official 
Among the public offices he has held are the general technical coordinator of the Presidency of the National Bank and Securities Commission (CNBV) from 1994-1996. He earned a seat as a federal congressman in 2000, serving in the Chamber of Deputies until 2003 whereupon he left office to run for the position of borough chief for the Alvaro Obregón precinct of Mexico City (he lost to the PRD candidate).

In 2006, President Felipe Calderón named him general director of Financiera Rural (a rural development bank) and he served there until July 31, 2010. On December 6, 2012, Enrique de la Madrid was named CEO of the National Foreign Trade Bank (Bancomext) by President Enrique Peña Nieto.

On August 27, 2015, De la Madrid took over as Tourism Secretary.

Private sector 
In the business sector, De la Madrid was executive president of the Mexican Council for the Consumer Industry (ConMéxico) and served as director of the Institutional Relations and Corporate Communications office for Mexico and Latin America at the HSBC bank.

Media 
He recently published his first book, titled “México en la generación del desarrollo” ("Mexico in the generation of development"). It was published by Random House. In the book, De la Madrid analyzes Mexico's achievements and its comparative advantages and proposes that the nation can achieve full development this generation.

He has also been a newspaper columnist at both Reforma and Milenio, as well as for several newspapers owned by the Organización Editorial Mexicana. He is currently a columnist with El Universal and takes part as a commentator in Leonardo Curzio's program "Primera Emisión de Enfoque".

External links
Mexico - Presidency of the Republic Website 
Rural Financing Website 
Wikipedia (Spanish) Article 

1962 births
20th-century Mexican lawyers
Institutional Revolutionary Party politicians
National Autonomous University of Mexico alumni
Harvard Kennedy School alumni
Living people
Members of the Chamber of Deputies (Mexico)
Mexican Secretaries of Tourism
21st-century Mexican politicians
Deputies of the LVIII Legislature of Mexico